Hemonia orbiferana is a moth of the family Erebidae. It was described by Francis Walker in 1863. It is found in Sri Lanka, India, Myanmar, Singapore, as well as on Borneo and Peninsular Malaysia.

Description
Head, thorax and forewings are dark purplish grey. Forewings with a fulvous speck on an ochreous ground at end of cell. A dark line runs from the costal center to near apex and then curved round to outer angle. Abdomen and hindwings pale ochreous. Bornean specimens are white.

Ecology
The habitat consists of lowland forests.

References

 

Nudariina
Moths described in 1863